Music from Mr. Lucky is a soundtrack album composed and conducted by Henry Mancini. The music is from the CBS-TV television series Mr. Lucky starring John Vivyan. The album's liner notes were written by Blake Edwards, the creator of the television series. It was released in 1960 on RCA Victor (catalog no. LSP-2198).

It entered Billboard magazine's pop album chart on March 28, 1960, peaked at No. 2, and remained on the chart for 35 weeks. AllMusic gave the album a rating of three stars. Reviewer Bruce Eder found the music "moody and occasionally interesting," but not as driving as his earlier soundtrack for Peter Gunn.

Track listing 
Side A
 "Mr. Lucky"
 "My Friend Andamo"
 "Softly"
 "March of the Cue Balls"
 "Lightly Latin"
 "Typsy"

Side B
 "Floating Pad"
 "One Eyed Cat"
 "Night Flower"
 "Chime Time"
 "Blue Satin"
 "That's It and That's All"

References

Henry Mancini albums
1960 soundtrack albums
RCA Victor soundtracks
Television soundtracks